Bell Flavors & Fragrances is an American multinational manufacturer of flavors; fragrances; botanicals and ingredients. Bell is privately held by the Heinz family. Bell Flavors & Fragrances was founded in 1912, as the William M. Bell Company in Chicago, Illinois. The founder had previously been a flavor chemist with Kraft Foods in their confectionery and caramel division. In the early years, Bell sold his flavors to local shops and candy companies.

History

Early Years 
In 1912, Bell Flavors & Fragrances began as the William M. Bell Company founded in Chicago, Illinois. Mr. Bell’s flavors were extremely innovative in the flavor industry. His previous education as a flavor chemist in confections gave him a great understanding of flavors, but it was his creative nature that captured his customers’ tastes. In the early years, William M. Bell sold his creative flavors to local ice cream parlors, grocery stores, and soda pop shops.

In 1930, the William M. Bell Company’s flavors became so demanding Bell had to expand. His first manufacturing facility was on West Grand Avenue in Chicago, Illinois. The location proved to be ideal, as Chicago quickly became the “Candy Capital of the World.” Today there is no “Candy Capital of the World,” but Chicago still ranks high in productivity in the confectionery market, as well as other food and beverage markets.

50's -60's 
In 1959, FEMA (Flavor Extract Manufacturing Association), led by Edward N. Heinz, took its first steps to establish the FEMA GRAS Program.

In 1960 the FEMA GRAS (Generally Recognized as Safe) program launches and would serve as the primary body for the safety evaluation of food flavorings for the flavor industry, and the public through its GRAS assessment of flavoring substances.

In 1968, Edward N. Heinz decided to leave his job at Food Materials and purchase his own company, The Wm. M. Bell Company from Theonett & Co. The Wm. M. Bell Company stayed in the Grand Avenue plant and leased office and manufacturing space from Theonett & Co. At the time of the purchase, Wm. M. Bell Co. had two employees, Mr. Harold Mathews and Ms. Anne Erlandson.

70's - 80's 
By 1974, Bell moved its operation to Melrose Park, Illinois, a suburb of Chicago. Bell rented a 30,000 square foot office and plant located at 3312 Bloomingdale Avenue. A year later Bell is featured in the Chicago Tribune for the chemistry side of the flavor business.

The following year in 1976, Bell made its first acquisition, Maumee Flavors & Fragrances, located in Danbury, Connecticut. Maumee developed a line of standard flavors and fragrances and also manufactured primary ingredients in the Anthranilate group (Methyl Anthranilate; Dimethyl Anthranilate; Ethyl Anthranilate) – key ingredients in creating berry and grape flavors. Bell moved the manufacturing of Maumee to its Melrose Park, Illinois plant, but kept some sales offices and labs on the East Coast.

In 1979, the Wm. Bell Company changed its name to Bell Flavors & Fragrances after Bell acquired a fragrance company in Chicago, Illinois, called Roubechez, Inc. This company specialized in developing and selling fragrances to the candle, soap, detergent and household care industries. Bell moved Roubechez, Inc. into their Melrose Park plant with the additional rental of 30,000 square feet of space in a separate building adjacent to its existing building. Edward Heinz receives the Distinguished Associate Award as the President of the NCA (National Confectioners’ Association) at the 1979 NCA/AACT Convention.

Bell purchases the flavor division of the Stepan Chemical Company in 1981 and moved its headquarters into a new manufacturing plant located at 500 Academy Drive, Northbrook, Illinois. This location is Bell’s Corporate Headquarters today. Bell’s acquisition of Stepan also included Fries & Bro. Founded in 1845, Fries & Bro. was the premier tobacco flavor company within the flavor industry. 2 years later Bell acquired Nestles flavor and fragrance division known as Synfleur. This acquisition acquired two additional manufacturing plants for Bell in White Lake, New York and Montecello, New York, as well as an R&D Center in Paramus, New Jersey. The Synfleur acquisition also led to them supplying Johnson & Johnson their baby powder fragrance for over 100 years. Synfleur also supplied Nestle with many of its flavors for beverages, confections, savory and dairy products.

In 1984 Bell consolidated the Synfleur R&D facility in Paramus, New Jersey into its existing R&D facility in North brook, Illinois. In 1985, Bell acquired American Brosynthetics Corporation located in Milwaukee, Wisconsin. American Brosynthetics was the only domestic producer of Helotropin, a primary ingredient used by the flavor and fragrance industry. This was Bell’s first main entry into the ingredient side of the flavor and fragrance industry.

Also, in 1985, Bell acquired a California flavor, fragrance and ingredient manufacturer called Ritter Company. Ritter was known for its manufacturing of butter derivatives, primarily butter acids and butter esters. In 1987, Mr. Edward N. Heinz passed away, but his sons continue the business.

90's-Present 
In 1993, Bell privatized the operations of Schimmel & Company in Leipzig, Germany. This company, originally founded in 1829, is considered to be the founding flavor and fragrance company in the world. This facility is home to the Schimmel Library, the oldest chemical library in the world. A year later, Bell purchases manufacturing plant from PFW-Hercules. This modern, 100,000 square foot plant, located in Middletown, New York, serves as Bell’s manufacturing for fragrances and botanicals, servicing their North American customers.

1995 Bell expands by acquiring the flavor company, Naturome, located in Brossard, Canada, a suburb of Montreal. The company was owned by John Haffaden and a few other employees. Naturome specialized in R&D research in flavors for beverages and dairy products (yogurts). This division is now called Bell Flavors & Fragrances, Canada. Bell also starts a flavor and fragrance business in Hong Kong to supply flavors and fragrances to China as well as the Asia Pacific countries. In the late 1990s to 2001, Bell opens offices in Russia, Poland, UK, France and Ukraine.

Thought the early 2000s Bell acquires more flavor and fragrance companies including: Empresa Industrial Izadora de Guadalajara S.A. de C.V. (EIGSA) out of Guadalajara, Mexico in 2001, and Penrith Akers from Minnesota in 2003.

In 2005 they opened a manufacturing facility in Shanghai, China. This facility has two separate plants, a flavor plant and a fragrance plant, along with R&D and administration offices. Bell was one of the first flavor and fragrance companies to be able to incorporate and not have a 50% joint venture with a Chinese company.

In 2007, Bell registered and trademarked Belltanicals®. This trademark was developed to support their botanical extract applications.

By 2009, Bell incorporates Bell Flavors & Fragrances do Brasil Ind. Com.E Repress, Ltda.

In 2012 Bell celebrates 100 years. The following year Bell secured an international subsidiary with the acquisition of Iceberg Industries flavor division in São Paulo Brazil.

Bell continues its operations today from its headquarters in North brook, Illinois along with its contiguous 85,000 sq ft warehouse that was built in 2011.

In 2021, Bell was ranked 13th on the Global Top 50 Food Flavors and Fragrances Companies list.

Products 
Flavors: Bell makes flavors for application in beverages, bakery, confections, dairy, savory, pet/animal care, and oral care. Bell offers flavors in liquid, powder, spray dry, and paste forms, and technology capabilities include flavor enhancers and modifiers, masking agents, bitterness suppressors, heating and cooling agents, salt reducers, and replacers/extenders for vanilla, cocoa, honey, and sweeteners.

Fragrances: Bell makes fragrances that are oil or water soluble, encapsulates, and dry blends for personal, fine, fabric, home, air, or pet care products

Botanical Extracts: Bell’s proprietary brand, Belltanicals®, offers botanical extracts, Essential Infusions, all-natural essential oil blends, certified organic extracts, and NOP-certified organic essential oil blends for personal and home care and food grade products.

Ingredient Specialties: Bell manufactures commercial quantities of raw materials for flavors and fragrances including natural chemicals, aroma specialties, aroma chemicals, and citrus concentrates.

Acquisitions
Edward N. Heinz, formerly Flavors Extract Manufacturing Association, purchased the William M. Bell Company in 1967. The business expanded to include fragrances and aromatic chemicals with the acquisition of Maumee Flavors and Fragrances, a division of Sherwin Williams Company in 1976, and in 1979, the niche fragrance house Roubechez which specialized in fragrances for cleaning and household care products.
 
In 1993, the company acquired the operations of Schimmel & Company, a well known Leipzig fragrance manufacturer originally founded in 1829.

In 1985 Bell acquired American Bio-Synthetics, at the time the only US producer of Heliotropin and many other specialty aroma chemicals. This facility was based in Milwaukee, Wisconsin, and became home to Bell's vastly expanding ingredients business, now headquartered in Middletown, New York.  The company also acquired Naturome in Brossard/Montreal, Quebec, Canada, a specialist in natural flavors and botanical extracts for the beverage, dairy, & yogurt industries.

In 2005, Bell opened a  manufacturing facility in Shanghai, China.

Certifications 
Bell has global certifications with OU Kosher (US & Europe), Kosher Certified (Canada),

Safe Quality Food Institute, ISO 9001:2015(US & Europe), The European Federation for Cosmetic Ingredients, Certified Organic, EU Organic (Europe), FAMI-QS(Europe), HACCP(Europe), FSS C22000(Europe), ISO 14001-2015(US) and ISO 2200-2018(US)

References

External links
 Bell Flavors & Fragrances website

Manufacturing companies based in Chicago
Chemical companies established in 1912
Flavor companies
Fragrance companies
1912 establishments in Illinois
Food and drink companies based in Illinois
Cosmetics companies of the United States